The Market of Vain Desire a 1916 American silent drama film directed by Reginald Barker. It stars Henry B. Warner and Clara Williams.

Prints of the film still exist and are preserved at the Library of Congress and with a private collector. The Market of Desire is now in the public domain.

Cast
Henry B. Warner as John Armstrong
Clara Williams as Helen Badgley
Charles Miller as Count Bernard d'Montaigne
Gertrude Claire as Mrs. Bladglley
Leona Hutton as Belle

References

External links
 
 

1916 films
1916 drama films
Silent American drama films
American silent feature films
American black-and-white films
Films directed by Reginald Barker
Triangle Film Corporation films
1910s American films